(Spanish, from ) is a type of sentence of imprisonment in the Philippines, Argentina, and several other Spanish-speaking countries.

Laws by region

Philippines
In the Philippines, it is one of two severe penalties, the other being life imprisonment, implemented to replace the death penalty and is in legal parlance near-synonymous with life imprisonment. However, there are some important distinctions between the two terms:

 Unlike life imprisonment,  carries a maximum sentence of 40 years. 
  is prescribed on crimes punishable by the Revised Penal Code, while life imprisonment is imposed on offenses punishable by Special Laws.
  carries the accessory penalty in which, as defined by Philippine Law, the prisoner is barred for life from holding political office. Life imprisonment does not carry this penalty.

 is the penalty handed down to inmates who have been convicted of capital crimes as well as what the Republic Act 7659 designates as "heinous crimes" once punishable by death:

 

However, they would be eligible for pardon once they have served a minimum of 30 years.

Notes

References

 Aquino, Ramon C. Revised Penal Code, Vol. I

Criminal law
Law of the Philippines
Sentencing (law)
Law of Argentina